Ed Blumquist is a fictional character and one of the lead protagonists from second season of the FX produced television series, Fargo. He is created by Noah Hawley and portrayed by Jesse Plemons, who was nominated for the Primetime Emmy Award for Outstanding Supporting Actor in a Limited Series or Movie for this role.

Character overview 
Ed is a butcher and the devoted husband of Peggy Blumquist. They live together in their hometown of Luverne, a small city in Minnesota. Ed is perfectly content with their life and believes that he is tracking well, with plans to buy the butcher shop where he works. Peggy, however, is unhappy with their life and feels that it is mundane. These feelings drive her towards psychosis which she displays subtly.

Storyline 
On a fateful day in 1979, Ed returns home to his wife making dinner and a noise coming from the garage. He discovers the car's windshield is cracked, and his wife Peggy tells him that she hit a deer on the way home. He then finds a badly injured man, Rye Gerhardt, in the garage. Rye is delirious and attacks him, leading Ed to accidentally kill Rye in self-defense. This is where he gains the first insight into his wife's mental issues. He asks her why, after she hit Rye with her car by accident, had she "brought him home, made dinner Hamburger Helper?" instead of reporting the incident. Without a sufficient answer, he continues to fulfill the role of the faithful husband and the two begin to plan a cover-up for the accident and disposal of the body.

Ed and Peggy decide to crash their car to explain the damage to the car and have Ed dispose of the body after hours at the butcher shop. Sheriff Deputy Lou Solverson walks in on the body grinding process but he doesn't put together what is going on. Later, when Lou  begins to put the incident together, he goes to visit and question Peggy and Ed. He also informs them that Rye Gerhardt is a member of the Gerhardt family, the most powerful crime syndicate in Fargo, North Dakota. They deny having anything to do with Rye's death and stick to their story despite Lou's offer of police protection. Following this conversation Peggy tries to get Ed to leave town and move to California with her, but Ed refuses to uproot the life that he works so hard for.

Ed is informed that the butcher shop is going to be sold to someone else if he doesn't have enough money by the end of the week. Soon after, he is attacked by two members of the Gerhardt family in the shop. He kills one of them with his butcher's cleaver, and the other one, Charlie, is hit by a ricocheted bullet and is badly injured. The shop was set on fire in the fight, and Ed carries injured Charlie out to safety. After making sure that the butcher's assistant can recount the events to the police, Ed rushes home to Peggy. Upon returning home, Peggy informs him that she sold her car so that they can pay for the shop and stay in Luverne.  Ed tells her what happened and  that  there is no more shop. They know they will soon be pursued by the Gerhardts and  the police, and opt to make a run for it.

Before they can flee, they are confronted by the police. Dodd Gerhardt, a main member of the Gerhardt family interceded before the police take any action. A skirmish ensues resulting in the incapacitation of the present police officers. Peggy is approached by Dodd but she manage to subdue him and takes him captive. Ed seizes this opportunity and devises a plan to trade him for their freedom. Ed and Peggy take refuge in a remote hunting cabin with their captive. After some failed negotiations with the Gerhardts, they set to meet a rival crime family from Kansas City to trade Dodd for a promise of protection and elimination of the Gerhardts. Before the meeting, Ed returns to find Dodd has escaped his binding,  and Peggy is lying on the ground, injured.  Dodd attacks him and hangs him nearly to death before Peggy manages to save him. Dodd turns towards them again to kill them, but Hanzee, a Gerhardt who was sent to save Dodd but went rogue bursts in and kills him. The police arrive immediately after and Peggy stabs Hanzee in the back as he escapes. The police take the couple into custody.

The couple are offered a deal by the South Dakota State Police where they receive reduced jail time and protective custody in their imminent trial. In exchange, Ed must follow through with the Kansas City meeting and wear a wire. While the police are holding the Blumquists in protection at the hotel, the Gerhardts attack, mistakenly thinking that Dodd is being held there. During the shootout, Ed and Peggy escape and Ed sees a UFO while they are running. Hanzee pursues them and shoots Ed. They keep running and lock themselves in a grocery store's cooler room. Ed sits in anguish and tells Peggy that he can see her problems clearly now and that their relationship is over, even though he still loves her and the idea of their life together. He then succumbs to his wound.

Production 
Ed's character (Plemons) and Peggy (Dunst) were the first two characters to be cast for the season, with the announcement made in December 2014.

Plemons had to style his appearance in many ways to fit showrunner Noah Hawley's image. He had already gained weight for his role in the film Black Mass, and he was instructed to keep it on against his wishes for Ed's character. The middle hair part that is an iconic element of Ed's appearance was also conceptualized by Hawley. He has since become engaged to marry his costar, Kirsten Dunst.

Reception 
Plemons' performance as Ed Blumquist was widely appreciated by audience and critics alike. Plemons won the Critics' Choice Television Award for Best Supporting Actor in a Movie/Miniseries.

Plemons was additionally nominated for a Primetime Emmy Award in the category of Outstanding Supporting Actor in a Limited Series or Movie for 2016-2017 which was awarded to Sterling K. Brown for his role in FX's The People v. O. J. Simpson: American Crime Story.

References 

Fargo (TV series) characters
Television characters introduced in 2015
Fictional butchers